The 2020 Mississippi Democratic presidential primary took place on March 10, 2020, as one of several states voting the week after Super Tuesday in the Democratic Party primaries for the 2020 presidential election. The Mississippi primary was an open primary, with the state awarding 41 delegates  towards the 2020 Democratic National Convention, of which 36 were pledged delegates allocated on the basis of the results of the primary.

Former vice president Joe Biden overwhelmingly won the primary in the southern state and every county with 81% of the vote, winning 34 of the 36 delegates, as he was the only candidate to get above 15% of the vote statewide. Senator Bernie Sanders narrowly missed the 15% threshold, and so he only received 2 district delegates.

Procedure
Mississippi was one of six states (along with Democrats Abroad) which held primaries on March 10, 2020, one week after Super Tuesday. Voting took place throughout the state from 7:00 a.m. until 7:00 p.m. In the open primary, candidates had to meet a threshold of 15 percent at the congressional district or statewide level in order to be considered viable. The 36 pledged delegates to the 2020 Democratic National Convention were allocated proportionally on the basis of the results of the primary. Of these, between 4 and 9 were allocated to each of the state's 4 congressional districts and another 5 were allocated to party leaders and elected officials (PLEO delegates), in addition to 8 at-large delegates. The March primary as part of Stage I on the primary timetable received no bonus delegates, in order to disperse the primaries between more different date clusters and keep too many states from hoarding on a March date.

After county conventions on March 14, 2020, where congressional district and state convention delegates were elected, congressional district conventions were slated for successive weeks between April 4 and April 25, 2020 in each of the state's congressional districts, at which district delegates to the national convention were selected. The state convention was then held on May 16, 2020, to vote on the 8 at-large and 5 pledged PLEO delegates for the Democratic National Convention. The delegation also included 5 unpledged PLEO delegates: 4 members of the Democratic National Committee and the sole representative from Congress, Bennie Thompson.

Candidates 
The following candidates qualified for the ballot in Mississippi:

Running

Joe Biden
Tulsi Gabbard
Bernie Sanders

Withdrawn

Michael Bloomberg
Pete Buttigieg
Amy Klobuchar
Deval Patrick
Tom Steyer
Elizabeth Warren
Andrew Yang

Polling

Results

Results by county

See also 
2020 Mississippi Republican presidential primary

Notes
Additional candidates

References

External links
The Green Papers delegate allocation summary

Mississippi Democratic
Democratic primary
2020